Bijagua is the fourth district of the Upala canton, in the Alajuela province of Costa Rica.

Geography 
Bijagua has an area of  km² and an elevation of  metres.

It is a small town approximately 26 km south of Upala in Northern plains of Costa Rica.

The town is situated in a valley between the Miravalles and Tenorio volcanoes.

Locations 
 Towns: Altamira, Carlos Vargas.   
 Hamlets: Ángeles, Achiote, Cuesta Pichardo, Chorros, Florecitas, Flores, Higuerón, Jardín, Macho, Pata de Gallo (San Cristóbal) (part), Pueblo Nuevo, Reserva, San Miguel, Santo Domingo, Zapote.

Economy 
The local economy is primarily farming, including vegetable production and cattle raising. Tourism exists due in part to the primary growth rainforest located in the area. 

Bijagua is approximately 16 km from Tenorio Volcano National Park and the Celeste River.

Demographics 

For the 2011 census, Bijagua had a population of  inhabitants.

Transportation

Road transportation 
The district is covered by the following road routes:
 National Route 6

References 

Districts of Alajuela Province
Populated places in Alajuela Province